A Millionaire for a Day is a 1912 American silent comedy short film starring John R. Cumpson. It was produced by the Independent Moving Pictures (IMP) Company of New York.

The story is based on a real-life incident reported in newspapers across the United States in January 1912. A John Jay McDevitt of Wilkes-Barre, Pennsylvania, sold an accidental nomination for county treasurer for $2500 and traveled to New York City with an entourage (a doctor, a secretary, a valet and about 20 guests) on a special train, making speeches to appreciative audiences at stops along the way and arriving with only $72.40 left. There he fulfilled his ambition of acting the way he believed a millionaire would, spending and tipping lavishly.

Plot
Mechanic Fred Dudley goes to New York City and squanders his entire inheritance in a day. Then, broke but wiser, he returns home to Wilkes-Barre.

Cast
 John R. Cumpson as Fred Dudley
 Frank Russell as The Foreman
 Frank Hall Crane as The Bank Cashier
 Hayward Mack as The Bank Teller
 Walter Long as The Clerk in the Clothing Store
 Rogers J.R. as The Gambler
  William Cunningham as The Judge

Preservation status
According to one source, George Eastman House has three film frames in its collection.

Reception 
The Meridian Daily Journal noted that the film was a "screaming comedy". The Calumet News also covered the film, reviewing it favorably.

References

External links
 

1912 films
1912 comedy films
1912 short films
Silent American comedy films
American films based on actual events
American silent short films
American black-and-white films
American comedy short films
Films set in New York City
Independent Moving Pictures films
1910s American films